Walter von Siebenthal (6 June 1899 – September 1958) was a Swiss ice hockey player who competed in the 1924 Winter Olympics. In 1924, he participated with the Swiss ice hockey team in the Winter Olympics tournament.

See also
List of Olympic men's ice hockey players for Switzerland

References

External links

1899 births
1958 deaths
Ice hockey players at the 1924 Winter Olympics
Olympic ice hockey players of Switzerland
Ice hockey people from Geneva
Swiss ice hockey left wingers